Beate Schubert (born 14 October 1957) is a German fencer. She competed in the women's team foil event for East Germany at the 1980 Summer Olympics.

References

External links
 

1957 births
Living people
German female fencers
Olympic fencers of East Germany
Fencers at the 1980 Summer Olympics
People from Borna
Sportspeople from Saxony